Naira Power is 1982 novel by Nigerian writer Buchi Emecheta. It was published as part of the Pacesetter series published by Macmillan.

References

External links
Naira Power on WorldCat

1982 Nigerian novels
Nigerian English-language novels
Novels set in Nigeria
Novels by Buchi Emecheta